Arganodus is an extinct genus of Ceratodontidae (lungfish). Its fossils have been found in the Redonda Formation, New Mexico, the Tacuarembó  Formation of Uruguay, and the Cumnock Formation, North Carolina, although the North Carolinian specimens are smaller than most recorded specimens. Fossils have also been uncovered in the Petrified Forest National Park. It was first named by Martin in 1979, and contains two species, A. dorotheae and A. atlantis. In 1984, Martin described Arganodus tiguidiensis from Elrhaz Formation of Niger extending its stratigraphic range from the Upper Jurassic to the Cenomanian. Later, this species was assigned to the genus Asiatoceratodus by Kemp (1998).

Paleoecology 
Arganodus was probably similar to modern lungfish, and lived in underwater burrows during dry periods until monsoons occurred.

References

External links 
 Arganodus at the Paleobiology Database
 Arganodus at Zipcodezoo.com
 The Geographic Distribution and Biostratigraphy of Late Triassic-Early Jurassic Freshwater Fish Faunas of the Southwestern United States
 www.texasfinearts.com
 Preliminary Review of the Early Jurassic (Hettangian) Fresh Water Lake Dixie Fish Fauna in the Whitmore Pointmemeber, Moenave Formation in Southwest Utah
 The Moncure Microvertibrate Fauna (Upper Triassic: Norian), Colon Cross-structure/Sanford Sub-basin, North Carolina, USA

Prehistoric lungfish genera
Late Triassic first appearances
Late Jurassic genus extinctions
Triassic bony fish
Jurassic bony fish
Norian life
Kimmeridgian life
Triassic fish of North America
Prehistoric fish of South America
Jurassic vertebrates of South America
Jurassic Uruguay
Fossils of Uruguay
Fossil taxa described in 1979